EPL may refer to:

Computing
 Easy Programming Language
 Eclipse Public License
 Eltron Programming Language, a control language for various computer printers
 Ethernet Powerlink, an Ethernet protocol
 Early PL/I, a PL/I subset dialect used to write Multics

Anatomy 
 Extensor pollicis longus muscle
 External plexiform layer

Education 

 École polytechnique de Louvain, faculty of engineering science at the University of Louvain (UCLouvain), Belgium

Libraries 
 Edmonton Public Library, in Alberta, Canada
 Euclid Public Library, in, Ohio, United States
 Evanston Public Library, in Illinois, United States
 Everett Public Library, in Washington, United States

Publications 
 EPL (journal), a scientific journal
 Eesti Päevaleht, an Estonian newspaper

Sports 
 Egyptian Premier League
 English Premier Ice Hockey League
 English Premier League
 ESL Pro League, a professional Counter-Strike: Global Offensive league
 Everest Premier League, a Nepali cricket league

Other uses 
 Edinburgh Partners, a Scottish investment firm
 El Pollo Loco, an American restaurant chain
 Employment practices liability
 Employment protection legislation
 Escola Portuguesa de Luanda, a Portuguese international school in Angola
 Popular Liberation Army, a Colombian guerrilla group